Trachystola granulata is a species of beetle in the family Cerambycidae. It was described by Francis Polkinghorne Pascoe in 1862. It is known from Malaysia, India, and Sumatra.

References

Lamiini
Beetles described in 1862